Mohammad Taghi Barkhordar known as Haji Barkhordar (1924 – 18 July 2011) was an Iranian industrialist and entrepreneur. He founded Pars Electric Manufacturing Company PJSC, the first company producing colour TVs in Iran. He had a key role in development of Iranian home appliances industry. After the Islamic revolution in 1979 and nationalisation of industries, he left the country and did not return before 1991.

References 

Businesspeople from Tehran
1924 births
2011 deaths
20th-century Iranian businesspeople
Iranian expatriates